Hans Hansen Bergen (–1654) was one of the earliest settlers of the Dutch colony of New Amsterdam, and one of the few from Scandinavia. He was a native of Bergen, Norway. Hans Hansen Bergen was a shipwright who served as overseer of an early tobacco plantation on Manhattan Island, before eventually removing to Brooklyn's Wallabout Bay, where he was one of the earliest settlers and founded a prominent Brooklyn clan.

Biography 
Hans Hansen Bergen emigrated to New Netherland in 1633 in a company with the Director-General of New Netherland, Wouter Van Twiller, and Bergen was initially known in early New Amsterdam records by various names, but chiefly Hans Hansen Noorman and Hans Hansen Boer.

Bergen was married to Sarah Rapelje, the first female child of European parentage born in the colony of New Netherland and whose chair is preserved in the collection of the Museum of the City of New York. Following Bergen's death in 1654, his widow remarried Teunis Gysbert Bogart.

Along with his father-in-law, Joris Jansen Rapelje,  Bergen acquired and managed several pieces of property. Rapelje was a substantial property owner, as well as one of the Council of Twelve Men. Following his land grant, Hans Hansen Bergen moved to the area on western Long Island now located within the borough of Brooklyn, where he made his living as a farmer. Apparently illiterate, Bergen signed his name to official documents with a simple 'H'. Following Bergen's death, in 1662 two of his sons settled at what is today's Bedford, Brooklyn, near their Rapelje grandfather.

Bergen is a place name which today appears frequently in Brooklyn. The neighborhood of Bergen Beach carries Bergen's name as do two New York City Subway stations at Smith Street and at Flatbush Avenue. Descendants of Hans Hansen Bergen owned the land that became Bergen Beach, which they subsequently sold to entrepreneur Percy Williams, who developed it into a summer resort. Some also believe that Bergen County, New Jersey as well as  Bergen Township take their names from this early Norwegian settler, although the evidence is inconclusive.

Descendants 
The descendants of Hans Hansen Bergen continued to reside in Brooklyn and Kings County, New York for centuries, and owned extensive tracts of land across Brooklyn. As late as the mid-19th century, Bergen family members grew up in Brooklyn speaking Dutch. Several family members – including John Teunis Bergen and Teunis Garret Bergen – represented the area in the United States Congress, as well as owning the forerunner of The Brooklyn Eagle newspaper.

Other descendants include John G. Bergen, the police commissioner of the New York City Police Department during the New York Draft Riots of 1863, and DeWitt Clinton, Mayor of New York City, Governor of New York State and United States Senator from New York. Bergen's descendants married into other early New Amsterdam families, including the Vanderbilts, the Voorhees, the Wyckoffs, the Cortelyous, the Denyses, the Suydams, the Vanderveers, Bensons among others. Among Bergen's present-day descendants is the American political figure Howard Dean.

An early history of the family of Hans Hansen Bergen and his descendants was written by Teunis Garret Bergen in 1866.

References

Footnotes

Sources 

 Jackson, Kenneth T. The Neighborhoods of Brooklyn (Manbeck, John B, Editor. Yale University Press: 1998)
 Walsh, Kevin. Forgotten New York: Views of a Lost Metropolis (Collins. September 26, 2006)
 Benardo, Leonard and  Jennifer Weiss.  Brooklyn by Name  (Published by NYU Press, 2006)
 The Bergen Family, or The Descendants of Hans Hansen Bergen, One of the Early Settlers of New York, and Brooklyn, L. I., (Teunis G. Bergen,  Albany, New York: Joel Munsell, 1876)
  Princeton Class of 1863, Fortieth-Year Book, (Nassau Hall, Princeton, New Jersey: Printed for the Class, 1904)
  Scandinavian Immigrants in New York, 1630–1674. (John O. Evjen,   Minneapolis, Minnesota: K. C. Holter Publishing Company,  1916)
 Mr. Tunis G. Bergen Jr., President of the Brooklyn Board of Education, NYPL Digital Gallery

1654 deaths
17th-century Norwegian people
Bergen family
Farmers from New York (state)
Norwegian emigrants to the United States
Norwegian emigrants to the Dutch Republic
Norwegian emigrants to New Netherland
People from Williamsburg, Brooklyn
People of New Netherland
Year of birth unknown
Year of birth uncertain